Crown Point may refer to one of these Oregon locations:

Crown Point (Oregon), a summit in Multnomah County
Crown Point, a populated place in Coos County, Oregon
Crown Point, a summit in Baker County, Oregon